{{Automatic taxobox
| name              = Boat orchids
| image             = Cymbidium iridioides-1-bsi-yercaud-salem-India.jpg
| image_caption     = Cymbidium iridioides
| display_parents   = 3
| taxon             = Cymbidium
| authority         = Swartz
| subdivision_ranks = Species
| subdivision       = See text.
| synonyms          = * Jensoa Raf.
 Cyperorchis Blume
 Iridorchis Blume nom. illeg.
 Arethusantha Finet
 Pachyrhizanthe (Schltr.) Nakai
 × Cyperocymbidium A.D.Hawkes
 Liuguishania Z.J.Liu & J.N.Zhang
 Wutongshania Z.J.Liu & J.N.Zhang
 Cymbidiopsis H.J.Chowdhery
| type_species =Cymbidium aloifolium}}Cymbidium , commonly known as boat orchids, is a genus of evergreen flowering plants in the orchid family Orchidaceae. Orchids in this genus are epiphytic, lithophytic, terrestrial or rarely leafless saprophytic herbs usually with pseudobulbs. There are usually between three and twelve leaves arranged in two ranks on each pseudobulb or shoot and lasting for several years. From one to a large number of flowers are arranged on an unbranched flowering stem arising from the base of the pseudobulb. The sepals and petals are all free from and similar to each other. The labellum is significantly different from the other petals and the sepals and has three lobes. There are about fifty-five species and sixteen further natural hybrids occurring in the wild from tropical and subtropical Asia to Australia. Cymbidiums are well known in horticulture and many cultivars have been developed.

Description
Plants in the genus Cymbidium are epiphytic, lithophytic or terrestrial plants, or rarely leafless saprophytes. All are sympodial evergreen herbs. Some species have thin stems but in most species the stems are modified as pseudobulbs. When present, there are from three to twelve leaves arrange in two ranks and last for several years. The leaf bases remain after the leaf has withered, forming a sheath around the pseudobulb. The flowers are arranged on an unbranched flowering stem which arises from the base of the pseudobulb or rarely from a leaf axil. The sepals and petals are usually thin and fleshy, free from, and more or less similar to each other. The labellum (as in other orchids, a highly modified third petal) is significantly different from the other petals and sepals. It is sometimes hinged to the column, or otherwise fused to it. The labellum has three lobes, the side lobes erect, sometimes surrounding the column and the middle lobe often curving downwards. After pollination a glabrous capsule containing many light coloured seeds is produced.

Taxonomy and naming
The genus Cymbidium was first formally described in 1799 by Olof Swartz who published the description in Nova acta Regiae Societatis Scientiarum Upsaliensis based on the description of Epidendrum aloifolium L. (Cymbidium aloifolium). The genus name Cymbidium is derived from the Latin word cymba meaning "cup" "bowl" or "boat" with the diminutive suffix -idium, hence "little boat", apparently in reference to the shape of the labellum in some species.

In 1848 Blume  moved Cymbidium elegans to form the genera Cyperorchis on the basis of the sessile lip that was fused at the base and moved Cymbidium iridioides (as C. giganteum) to section Iridorchis in 1854. Following the discovery of more species Schlechter created more sections and merged. The genus was revised again in 1970 by P.F. Hunt who changed Cyperorchis to a section. In 1984 Seth and Cribb divided the genus into three subgenera Cyperorchis, Jensoa, and Cymbidium with multiple section. Dupuy and Cribb modified the sections in 1988 The three subgeneras were confirmed by molecular phylogeny, however the sections did not show monophyly.

Species
The following is a list of Cymbidium species accepted by the Plants of the World Online as at April 2022 separated into subgenera:

Subgenus Cymbidium
Plants in this subgenus have two pollinia, each deeply cleft with callus ridges

Subgenus Cyperorchis
Plants in subgenus Cyberorchis have lips fused at the base to the base of the column. 

Subgenus Jensoa
Plants in this subgenus have four pollinia, in two unequal pairs; lips attached to the base of the column, 

Natural HybridsCymbidium × ballianum RolfeCymbidium × baoshanense F.Y.Liu & PernerCymbidium × dilatatiphyllum J.M.H.ShawCymbidium × florinda RolfeCymbidium × gammieanum King & Pantl.Cymbidium × glebelandense RolfeCymbidium × hillii F.Muell. ex RegelCymbidium × monanthum J.M.H.ShawCymbidium × nishiuchianum Makino ex J.M.H.ShawCymbidium × nomachianum T.Yukawa & Nob.TanakaCymbidium × nujiangense X.P.Zhou, S.P.Lei & Z.J.LiuCymbidium × oblancifolium Z.J.Liu & S.C.ChenCymbidium × purpuratum L.J.Chen, Li.Q.Li & Z.J.LiuCymbidium × rosefieldense RolfeCymbidium × woodlandense Rolfe

Distribution
This genus is distributed in tropical and subtropical Asia (such as northern India, China, Japan, Malaysia, the Philippines, and Borneo) and Australia. The large flowering species from which the large flowering hybrids are derived usually grow at low altitudes, while short leaved species, from which compact hybrids with small to medium size flowers are derived, are high altitudes lithophytes and epiphytes.

Uses
Use in horticultureCymbidium (abbreviated Cym. in the horticultural trade) orchids are among the oldest horticultural orchids in the world and were mentioned in a manuscript from the Jin dynasty from about 200 BCE and by Confucius. Today they are among the most popular orchid genera in cultivation. They have decorative flowers spikes and are one of the least demanding indoor orchids. To flower well they need a distinct difference between day and night temperatures in late summer. Plants need to remain outside in autumn until night temperatures drop to near .

Cymbidiums have few pests or diseases but can be affected by aphids, spider mites and viral diseases.

Use in cooking
The species Cymbidium hookerianum'' is considered a delicacy in Bhutan, where it is traditionally cooked in a spicy curry or stew and called "olatshe" or "olachoto".

References

External links

 Multikey System for Identification of Cymbidium species
 Cymbidium Society of America
 Cymbidium Club of Australia

 
Cymbidiinae genera
Epiphytic orchids
Taxa named by Olof Swartz